Kirill Igorevich Marchenko (born 21 July 2000) is a Russian professional ice hockey winger currently playing with the  Columbus Blue Jackets of the National Hockey League (NHL). Marchenko was selected by the Blue Jackets with the 49th overall pick in the 2018 NHL Entry Draft.

Playing career
Marchenko made his debut in the Kontinental Hockey League (KHL) during the 2017–18 season, with HC Yugra.

After four seasons in the KHL with perennial contending club, SKA Saint Petersburg, Marchenko at the conclusion of the 2021–22 season, opted to pursue a North American career in agreeing to a two-year, entry-level contract with draft club, the Columbus Blue Jackets, on 2 May 2022.

Career statistics

Regular season and playoffs

International

References

External links
 

2000 births
Living people
Cleveland Monsters players
Columbus Blue Jackets draft picks
Columbus Blue Jackets players
Mamonty Yugry players
Russian ice hockey forwards
SKA Saint Petersburg players
SKA-Neva players
SKA-1946 players
Sportspeople from Barnaul
HC Yugra players